Kurvits is an Estonian surname, and may refer to:
 Ado Kurvits (1897–1958), Estonian Communist politician
 Ants Kurvits (1887–1943), Estonian military personnel
 Juhan Kurvits (1895–1939), Estonian politician

Estonian-language surnames